U.S. Highway 81 (US 81) is a U.S. Highway that begins at an interchange with Interstate 35W/US 287 (I-35W/US 287) in northern Fort Worth in Texas. US 81 leaves the state and crosses the Red River into Oklahoma between Ringgold, Texas, and Terral, Oklahoma.

Route description
US 81 begins at an interchange with I-35W/US 287 in northern Fort Worth. The two highways travel northwest as a freeway, passing by the Bureau of Engraving and Printing near Blue Mound Road (Farm to Market Road 156, FM 156), through the city's northwest side. US 81/US 287 leaves the city of Fort Worth and enters Wise County near Avondale. The highway runs through or near the towns of Rhome, New Fairview, Decatur, Alvord, and Sunset before separating in southern Bowie. US 81 runs through the town as Wise Street, running in a more east–west direction before turning in a more north–south direction at FM 174. The highway has a mostly rural route, running through western Montague County, before crossing the Red River into Oklahoma.

History
The 1936 Official Map of the Highway System of Texas clearly shows the route labeled both as US 81 and SH 2. In 1940 US 287 was extended south into Texas, and a  stretch from Fort Worth northwest to Bowie was cosigned with US 81. The summer 1941 Texas Highway Map shows this pairing, and the current southern terminus of US 81 is still cosigned with US 287.

The spring and summer 1949 Texas Highway Department Official Map designates the length of US 81 from Laredo to Fort Worth as part of the National System of Interstate Highways, but no numeric designation was given at the time.

It was not until 1959 that parts of US 81 in Texas appeared on the Texas Official Highway Travel Map cosigned with I-35 shields. In 1980, US 81 was cosigned with I-35 and I-35W except where the Interstate bypassed towns; US 81 provided the main route through town and then reconnected with I-35 on the other side. This section of US 81 became SH 81 in 1991 when most of US 81 in Texas was decommissioned. The section of highway from Devine to Lytle became SH 132 and the section from Derby to the Pearsall town square became Spur 581 when US 81 south of Fort Worth was decommissioned in 1991.

Junction list

See also
 Texas State Highway 81
 Texas State Highway 132
 Texas State Highway Spur 581

References

 Texas
Transportation in Tarrant County, Texas
Transportation in Wise County, Texas
Transportation in Montague County, Texas
81